Firdavsi (formerly Buragen) is a village in Sughd Region, northern Tajikistan. It is part of the jamoat Shahriston in Shahriston District. It is located on the M34 highway.

References

Populated places in Sughd Region